Deshbandhu is a Hindi newspaper. It was launched on 17 April 1959 from Raipur, now capital of Chhattisgarh, by veteran journalist Mayaram Surjan. In 2008, Deshbandhu started its National Edition from New Delhi, thus, becoming the first newspaper in central India to achieve this feat. Today Deshbandhu is published from 8 cities: Raipur, Bilaspur, Bhopal, Jabalpur Sagar Satna and New Delhi.

In addition, the group also publishes a broadsheet Hindi eveninger – Highway Channel – from Raipur, Bilaspur and Jagdalpur; a monthly literary journal – Akshar Parv; and also reference books from time to time.

Deshbandhu promoted and set up several public service institutions, namely Deshbandhu Pratibha Protsahan Kosh, Mayaram Surjan Foundation and Jandarshan Media Centre.

References

External links
 Official website of Chhattisgarh
 People website of Chhattisgarh
 Deshbandhu
 Deshbandhu MP

Hindi-language newspapers
Mass media in Chhattisgarh
1959 establishments in Madhya Pradesh
Newspapers established in 1959
Raipur district